Marwan Effendy (13 August 1953 – 9 March 2015) was an Indonesian government official. His last position was Deputy Attorney General of Supervision. Marwan Effendy served as Junior Attorney General for Special Crimes at a time when its  credibility was battered by the alleged bribery of Gunawan. Marwan Effendy also taught law at Trisakti University. On October 4, 2012, Marwan became a professor at Sam Ratulangi University.

References

1953 births
2015 deaths
20th-century Indonesian lawyers
Padjadjaran University alumni
Academic staff of Sam Ratulangi University
Academic staff of Trisakti University
People from South Sumatra
21st-century Indonesian lawyers